Wicked Tuna is a reality television series about commercial tuna fishermen based in Gloucester, Massachusetts who fish for the lucrative Atlantic bluefin tuna in the North Atlantic Ocean. The teams of fisherman battle each other to see who can get the most profit from catching tuna. The series has aired on National Geographic Channel since April 1, 2012. As of June 8, 2020, 130 episodes of Wicked Tuna have aired in over 9 seasons accompanied by 11 specials.

Series overview

Episodes

Season 1 (2012)

Season 2 (2013)

Season 3 (2014)

Season 4 (2015)

Season 5 (2016)

Season 6 (2017)

Season 7 (2018)

Season 8 (2019)

Season 9 (2020)

Specials

References

Lists of reality television series episodes
Lists of American non-fiction television series episodes